Rosenithon is a hamlet east of St Keverne in west Cornwall, England.

The name Rosenithon comes from the Cornish language Ros an Eythin, which means 'the hill-spur of gorse'.

References

Hamlets in Cornwall
St Keverne